Posada de Valdeón (Astur-Leonese: Valdión) is a municipality located in the province of León, Castile and León, Spain.

Population 
According to the 2006 census (INE), the municipality has a population of 526 inhabitants.

Villages 
Posada de Valdeón's municipality has eight villages (Popular name / Official name):
 Caín / Caín de Valdeón
 Santa Marina / Santa Marina de Valdeón
 Caldevilla / Caldevilla de Valdeón
 Cordiñanes / Cordiñanes de Valdeón
 Los Llanos / Los Llanos de Valdeón
 Posada / Posada de Valdeón
 Prada / Prada de Valdeón
 Soto / Soto de Valdeón

Climate  

Vega de Liordes, an enclave in the Leon sector of Picos de Europa belonging to the municipality of Posada de Valdeón registered  on January 7, 2021.

References

Municipalities in the Province of León
Picos de Europa